Aryan is a 2006 Indian Hindi-language sports drama film written and directed by Abhishek Kapoor and produced by Poonam Khubani, Manisha Israni and Vipin Anand. The film stars Sohail Khan and Sneha Ullal with Puneet Issar, Satish Shah, Supriya Karnik and Inder Kumar in supporting roles.

Plot
Aryan is the college boxing champion. He is training under Ranveer Singh Bagga with another student Ranjeet, in order to achieve his dream: winning the national championship. His girlfriend Neha supports him unconditionally, and he relies heavily upon her. However, after his life turns unexpectedly into another direction, he gives up boxing and marries instead. He becomes a father and takes up a job as sports' commentator. Despite this, his life suffers severe ups and downs in the process. Aryan also learns that Ranjeet got kicked out of the college boxing team by coach Ranveer for taking steroids in the locker room, and the former suspects Aryan had informed him, leaving Aryan confused and frustrated. Aryan's frustration further leads him to suspect Neha of having an affair with her boss and director Sameer. Because of his temper, Neha and Ranveer separate from him shortly after that. In order to win his self-esteem back, Aryan accepts the proposal for making a comeback in boxing. Ranjeet challenges Aryan in the national boxing championship in order to exact his revenge from the latter. Aryan undergoes rigorous training and faces Ranjeet in the finals. A fight ensues in the ring where Ranjeet almost defeats Aryan after severely injuring him. But at the last minute, Neha, who forgives Aryan, goes to the stadium to support him. After witnessing Neha, Aryan subsequently defeats Ranjeet and becomes the national boxing champion, and reconciles with his family.

Cast
 Sohail Khan as Aryan Verma
 Sneha Ullal as Neha Verma
 Inder Kumar as Ranjeet Singh
 Puneet Issar  as Ranveer Singh Bagga (Aryan's coach)
 Farida Jalal as Mrs. Braganza (Aryan's neighbour)
 Satish Shah as Kiran (Neha's father)
 Supriya Karnik as Devika (Neha's mother)
 Kapil Dev as himself
 Ahsaas Channa as Ranveer Verma (Aryan's son)
 Fardeen Khan as Sameer (cameo)
 Suved Lohia as Jaideep Malhotra (Aryan's friend)

Soundtrack
The music for Sultan is composed by Anand Raaj Anand.

According to the Indian trade website Box Office India, with around 11,00,000 units sold, this film's soundtrack album was the year's thirteenth highest-selling.
Ek Look Ek Look (Dhol Mix) - Anand Raj Anand, Poonam Khubani
Ek Look Ek Look Pyar - Anand Raj Anand, Poonam Khubani
Chhuna Hai Aasman Ko - Bianca Gomes, Ranjit Barot
Ek Look Ek Look Pyar Wali Sajna (Remix) - Anand Raj Anand, Poonam Khubani
Sajan Ghar Aana Tha (Janeman) - Shreya Ghoshal, Sonu Nigam 
Its Beautiful Day - Hamza Faruqui, Shreya Ghoshal
Lamha Lamha - Anand Raj Anand
Rab Ne Mere - Kunal Ganjawala, Shreya Ghoshal
Teri Te Me - Pamela Jain, Anand Raj Anand

Critical response
Taran Adarsh of Bollywood Hungama gave the film 1.5 stars out of 5, writing "On the whole, ARYAN is a well-made film that combines style and substance beautifully. Unfortunately, the box-office will sing a different tune altogether! Reasons: [i] Not-too-attractive face-value, [ii] Delayed release and [iii] Oppositions in Kabul Express this week and Bhagam Bhag next week. To sum up, despite strong merits, ARYAN will be knocked down in the box-office ring!" Priyanka Jain of Rediff.com gave a negative review, stating "Seriously, I too don't understand why anyone would make a film like this."

References

External links
 

2000s Hindi-language films
2006 films
Indian boxing films
Films scored by Anand Raj Anand
Indian action drama films
Indian sports drama films
2006 directorial debut films
Films directed by Abhishek Kapoor
2000s action drama films
2000s sports drama films